Maury Street Marker, Jefferson Davis Highway is a historic route marker located on U.S. Route 1, or Jefferson Davis Highway, in Richmond, Virginia. It was erected in 1935, by the United Daughters of the Confederacy (UDC). It is one of 16 erected in Virginia along the Jefferson Davis Highway between 1927 and 1947. The marker is an inscribed granite slab with smooth flat faces and rough-cut edges. The stone is engraved with the text "Jefferson Davis Highway Erected by Elliott Grays Chapter United Daughters of the Confederacy 1935".

It was listed on the National Register of Historic Places in 2004.

See also

 Auto trail
 List of memorials to Jefferson Davis

References

Buildings and structures completed in 1935
Buildings and structures in Richmond, Virginia
Historic trails and roads in Virginia
Individual signs in the United States
Individual signs on the National Register of Historic Places
Jefferson Davis Highway
Monuments and memorials on the National Register of Historic Places in Virginia
National Register of Historic Places in Richmond, Virginia
Road transportation buildings and structures on the National Register of Historic Places
Transportation buildings and structures on the National Register of Historic Places in Virginia
United Daughters of the Confederacy monuments and memorials
U.S. Route 1
Confederate States of America monuments and memorials in Virginia
1935 establishments in Virginia